La strada is the debut and only album by the Serbian alternative rock La Strada, released by M Produkcija Radio Novog Sada in 1987. Despite being released in LP format in 500 copies only and never rereleased on CD, the album is considered a highly influential release on the former Yugoslav scene.

Track listing
All lyrics and music written by Slobodan Tišma.

Personnel
La Strada
 Daniel Stari — bass
 Robert Radić — drums
 Žolt Horvat — guitar
 Jasmina Mitrušić — keyboards
 Slobodan Tišma — vocals

Additional personnel
 Rex Ilusivii — producer
 Jan Šaš — sound engineer
 Boro Popržan — artwork by [design]

Cover versions
 Serbian alternative rock band Veliki Prezir recorded a cover version of "Okean" on the 1999 cover various artists compilation Korak napred 2 koraka nazad.
 Serbian punk rock band Novembar recorded a cover version of "Mlad i radostan" on their 2008 cover album Radulizam.
 The Serbian alternative music group Horkestar, composed of a five piece band and a thirty piece choir, performs the song "Neautentičan sneg" on their live appearances.

References

 EX YU ROCK enciklopedija 1960-2006, Janjatović Petar; 
 NS rockopedija, novosadska rock scena 1963-2003, Mijatović Bogomir; Publisher: SWITCH, 2005

1987 debut albums
La Strada (band) albums